John Dutton Conant Little (born February 1, 1928)  is an Institute Professor at the Massachusetts Institute of Technology best known for his result in operations research, Little's law.

Biography

Born in Boston, he earned a S.B. in physics from Massachusetts Institute of Technology (1948) and worked at General Electric (1948–50).  His PhD on Use of Storage Water in a Hydroelectric System used dynamic programming, and advised by Philip M. Morse, was the first ever awarded in operations research (1955).
Next, he taught at the Case Institute of Technology (now part of Case Western Reserve) from 1957 to 1962, before joining the faculty at MIT in 1962 where he since has worked. He was visiting professor at INSEAD (1988).

His earlier research in operations research involved traffic signal control, and gave him fame as he formed the Little's law in 1961. It states: "The average number of customers in a stable system (over some interval) is equal to their average arrival rate, multiplied by their average time in the system."  A corollary has been added: "The average time in the system is equal to the average time in queue plus the average time it takes to receive service." Little is considered to be a founder of marketing science, having conducted fundamental research in models of individual choice behavior, adaptive control of promotional spending, and marketing mix models for consumer packaged goods. He has also started companies such as Management Decisions Systems and Kana Software.  The John D. C. Little Award is awarded annually by INFORMS. He is the father of John N. Little.

Little was elected a member of the National Academy of Engineering (1989) for outstanding contributions to operational systems engineering including research, education, and applications in industry and leadership.

Publications
The Use of Storage Water in a Hydroelectric System, Journal of the Operations Research Society of America, Vol. 3, No. 2 (May, 1955), pp. 187–197

Models and Managers: The Concept of a Decision Calculus, in Management Science: A Journal of the Institute for Operations Research and the Management Sciences, 16(8):466-4855, 1970
Decision Support Systems for Marketing Managers (1984)
The Marketing Information Revolution (Harvard Business School Press, 1994).  With Robert C. Blattberg and Rashi Glazer

Awards
National Academy of Engineering electee (1989)
Parlin and Converse Awards of the American Marketing Association
Honorary degrees from University of Liège and University of Mons-Hainaut
George E. Kimball Medal of the Institute for Operations Research and the Management Sciences
Fellow of INFORMS and the American Association for the Advancement of Science
Buck Weaver Award from MIT Sloan School of Management 2003.

References

External links 
 John Little page at MIT
 Biography of John Little from the Institute for Operations Research and the Management Sciences

Massachusetts Institute of Technology faculty
Case Western Reserve University faculty
Queueing theorists
American operations researchers
MIT Department of Physics alumni
People from Boston
1928 births
Fellows of the American Association for the Advancement of Science
Fellows of the Institute for Operations Research and the Management Sciences
Members of the United States National Academy of Engineering
Living people
MIT Sloan School of Management faculty